The 1847 Massachusetts gubernatorial election was held on November 8.

Incumbent Whig Governor George N. Briggs was re-elected to a fifth term in office over Democrat Caleb Cushing. This was the last election in which the Whig Party received a majority of the vote; after the emergence of the Free Soil Party in 1848, Whigs only won pluralities before fading away entirely by the 1857 election.

Democratic nomination

Candidates
Henry W. Bishop
Caleb Cushing, former U.S. Minister to China and U.S. Representative from Newburyport
Isaac Davis, State Senator from Worcester and nominee for Governor in 1845 and 1846
David Henshaw, former U.S. Secretary of the Navy

Convention

General election

Candidates
Francis Baylies, former U.S. Chargé d'Affaires in Buenos Aires and U.S. Representative from Taunton 
Caleb Cushing, former U.S. Minister to China and U.S. Representative from Newburyport (Democratic)
George N. Briggs, incumbent Governor since 1844 (Whig)
Samuel Edmund Sewall, Liberty nominee for Governor since 1842 (Liberty)

Results

See also
 1847 Massachusetts legislature

References

Governor
1847
Massachusetts
November 1847 events